War Games (sometimes stylized as Wargames) is a 2005 studio album by American turntablist Rob Swift. It was released on Coup De Grace.

Reception
Marisa Brown of AllMusic gave the album 4 stars out of 5, describing it as "an ominous soundtrack to the DJ's perspective on the state of the contemporary world". She said, "It's complex, intelligent, and provocative, and it's certainly worth listening to."

Track listing

References

External links
 

2005 albums
Rob Swift albums